Capryl alcohol may refer to:

commonly yet incorrectly to one of several isomers of octanol, typically 1-octanol, being confused for the proper caprylyl alcohol
correctly yet uncommonly to one of several isomers of decanol, typically 1-decanol

Fatty alcohols
Alkanols